King Lizard was a four-piece rock band from London, England.

Biography 
The band first formed in 2002, and after extensive line-up changes, took its final form in 2010.
	 	
Lead singer Flash Roxx started the band at age 19. Sky London became the band's drummer after original one left. Israeli guitarist Niro Knox, who was in a band called Skintight Jaguars, then joined. Last to join the band was bassist Alice Rain, who came from Rome to London to find a band. In 2010, Lee Benz replaced Alice Rain on bass, and Moyano El Buffalo replaced Sky London on drums.

Discography 
Late Night Dynamite EP (2007)
Viva La Decadence (Psycho DeVito Records 2010)
Nightmare livin' the dream (2012)
Live Bites (2013)
New Album TBA (2015)

Videos 

 Hard to Get 
 Viva La Decadence 
 Rock 'n Roll Me 
 Rain on You 
 Not For Me 
 A Nightmare Livin' the Dream 
 Just to Hear You Say It

Videos 
Viva La Decadence - Title song from the album "Viva La Decadence". Produced by Adi Koren and King Lizard
Rock and Roll Me - A professionally made video, shot mainly in black and white.
Hard To Get - A performance video, cut from several live gigs.
Outrageous (Live) - A Live performance at the Barfly, London. 23.12.07

External links
 Official King Lizard website
 Official King Lizard myspace
 King Lizard videos on YouTube

English rock music groups